Singalangia is a monotypic genus of Sumatran araneomorph spiders in the family Tetrablemmidae containing the single species, Singalangia sternalis. It was first described by Pekka T. Lehtinen in 1981, and is found on Sumatra.

See also
 List of Tetrablemmidae species

References

Monotypic Araneomorphae genera
Spiders of Asia
Taxa named by Pekka T. Lehtinen
Tetrablemmidae